An Estonian seafarer's discharge book (Estonian: Meremehe teenistusraamat) is an identity document issued by Estonian Police and Border Guard Board in which the name, date of birth or personal identification code, and a photograph or facial image and the signature or image of signature of the holder are entered, unless otherwise provided by law or legislation established on the basis thereof. A seafarer who is an Estonian citizen shall be issued a seafarer’s discharge book which complies with the requirements of the “Convention concerning Seafarers’ National Identity Documents” of the International Labour Organisation (ILO). A seafarer’s discharge book shall be issued with a period of validity of up to five years.

Identity Information Page

The Estonia Passport includes the following data:

 Photo of passport holder
 Type (S)
 Code of Issuing State (EST)
 Passport No.
 1 Surname
 2 Given Names
 3 Nationality
 4 Date of Birth
 5 Personal No.
 6 Sex
 7 Place of Birth
 8 Date of Issue
 9 Authority
 10 Date of Expiry
 11 Holder's Signature

The information page ends with the Machine Readable Zone.

Languages

The data page/information page is printed in Estonian and English.

Biometric temporary travel documents

Starting from June 2009, all applicants for an Estonian seafarer's discharge book are required to provide their fingerprints to be stored on the biometric chip in their seafarer's discharge book.

See also
Police and Border Guard Board

References

External links
Sample seafarer’s discharge book, issued starting from 01.03.2014
Police and Border Guard Board

Transport in Estonia
International travel documents